Khoshk Bur (also Romanized as Khoshk Būr; also known as Khoshkeh Būr) is a village in Tameshkol Rural District, Nashta District, Tonekabon County, Mazandaran Province, Iran. At the 2006 census, its population was 307, in 79 families.

References 

Populated places in Tonekabon County